Shouse is a surname. Notable people with the surname include:

 Brian Shouse (born 1968), American baseball player
 Catherine Filene Shouse (1896–1994), American researcher and philanthropist
 Jouett Shouse (1879–1968), American lawyer, newspaper publisher, and politician

Surnames